Juniperus osteosperma (Utah juniper; syn. J. utahensis) is a shrub or small tree native to the southwestern United States.

Description 
The plant reaches , rarely to 9 m, tall. The shoots are fairly thick compared to most junipers,  in diameter. The leaves are arranged in opposite decussate pairs or whorls of three; the adult leaves are scale-like, 1–2 mm long (to 5 mm on lead shoots) and 1–1.5 mm broad. The cones are berry-like,  in diameter, blue-brown with a whitish waxy bloom, and contain a single seed (rarely two); they mature in about 18 months and are eaten by birds and small mammals. The male cones are 2–4 mm long, and shed their pollen in early spring. It is largely monoecious with both sexes on the same plant, but around 10% of plants are dioecious, producing cones of only one sex.

Distribution and habitat 
The species is native to the southwestern United States, in Utah, Nevada, Arizona, western New Mexico, western Colorado, Wyoming, southern Montana, southern Idaho and eastern California.

Ecology 
Seeds are dispersed by a variety of mammals and birds. Mammals include jackrabbits (mostly the black-tailed jackrabbit Lepus californicus spp.) rodents and to a lesser extent by coyotes (Canis latrans). Most notable among the birds that disperse juniper berries is the Townsend's solitaire (Myadestes townsendi).

Uses 
Native Americans such as the Havasupai used the bark for a variety of purposes, including beds, and ate the cones both fresh and in cakes. The Havasupai used the gum to make a protective covering over wounds. Additionally, the Yavapai gave their women a tea made from the leaves to calm their contractions after giving birth, and fumigated them with smoke from the leaves placed over hot coals. The Navajo sweep their tracks with boughs from the trees so death will not follow them.

A small quantity of ripe berries can be eaten as an emergency food or as a sage-like seasoning for meat. The dried berries can be roasted and ground into a coffee substitute.

Utah juniper is an aromatic plant. Essential oil extracted from the trunk and limb is prominent in α-pinene, δ-3-carene, and cis-thujopsene. Essential oil extracted from the leaf is prominent in camphor and bornyl acetate. The trunk of Utah juniper retains essential oil for at least 20 years after the tree dies, and is prominent in cedrol and cis-thujopsene.

See also
Pinyon-juniper woodland

References

R.P. Adams. Junipers of the World: The genus Juniperus. Trafford Publishing

External links

USDA Plant Profile: Juniperus osteosperma
Gymnosperm Database: Juniperus osteosperma
Flora of North America: Juniperus osteosperma
 Jepson Manual - Juniperus osteosperma
Juniperus osteosperma - Photo Gallery
Interactive Distribution Map of Juniperus osteosperma

osteosperma
Trees of the Great Basin
Flora of the California desert regions
Trees of the Western United States
Trees of the Southwestern United States
Trees of the Northwestern United States
Trees of the South-Central United States
Least concern flora of the United States
Flora of North America